This is a list of township-level divisions of the province of Hainan, People's Republic of China (PRC). After province, prefecture, and county-level divisions, township-level divisions constitute the formal fourth-level administrative divisions of the PRC. There are a total of 222 such divisions in Hainan, divided into 18 subdistricts, 183 towns, and 21 townships.

Haikou

Longhua District

Subdistricts:
Jinmao Subdistrict, Binhai Subdistrict, Haiken Subdistrict, Jinyu Subdistrict, Zhongshan Subdistrict, Datong Subdistrict

Towns:
Chengxi, Longqiao, Longquan, Zuntan, Xinpo

Meilan District

Subdistricts:
Bailong Subdistrict, Lantian Subdistrict, Haifu Road Subdistrict, Bo'ai Subdistrict, Hepingnan Subdistrict, Baisha Subdistrict, Renmin Road Subdistrict, Haidian Subdistrict, Xinbu Subdistrict

Towns:
Lingshan, Yanfeng, Sanjiang, Dazhipo

Qiongshan District

Towns:
Fucheng, Longtang, Yunlong, Hongqi, Jiuzhou, Sanmenpo, Jiazi, Dapo

The only subdistrict is Guoxing Subdistrict

Xiuying District

Subdistricts:
Xiuying Subdistrict, Haixiu Subdistrict

Towns:
Xixiu, Changliu, Haixiu, Shishan, Yongxing, Dongshan

Sanya

Jiyang District
Former Subdistrict:
Hedongqu Subdistrict

Former Towns:
Jiyang also known as Tiandu

Tianya District
Former Subdistrict:
Hexiqu Subdistrict

Former Towns:
Fenghuang, Tianya, Yucai

Haitang District
Former Town:
Haitangwan

Yazhou District
Former Towns:
Yacheng

Sansha

Note: The territory of the Sansha is claimed by many countries, including the PRC. The PRC exercises complete control over the Paracels (Xisha), partial control over the Spratlys (Nansha), and no control of the Macclesfield Bank & Scarborough Shoal (Zhongsha).

Towns:
Yongxing Town Management Area, Qilianyu Management Area, Yonglequndao Management Area

Danzhou

Note: Here, the county-level divisions are absent, so the township-level divisions are at the third level of administration.

Towns:
Nada, Heqing, Nanfeng, Dacheng, Yaxing, Lanyang, Guangcun, Mutang, Haitou, Eman, Sandu, Wangwu, Baimajing, Zhonghe, Paipu, Dongcheng, Xinzhou

County-level divisions under direct provincial administration
Unlike the other provinces of the PRC, most of Hainan is directly divided into county-level divisions, and so the township-level divisions below are at the third, rather than fourth, level of administration.

Dongfang

Towns:
Basuo, Donghe, Datian, Gancheng, Banqiao, Sanjia, Sigeng, Xinlong

Townships:
Tian'an Township, Jiangbian Township

Qionghai

Towns:
Jiaji, Wanquan, Shibi, Zhongyuan, Bo'ao, Yangjiang, Longjiang, Tanmen, Tayang, Changpo, Dalu, Huishan

Wanning

Towns:
Wancheng, Longgun, Shangen, Hele, Hou'an, Damao, Dong'ao, Liji, Changfeng, Beida, Nanqiao, Sangengluo

Wenchang

Towns:
Wenchang, Chongxing, Penglai, Huiwen, Donglu, Tanniu, Dongge, Wenjiao, Dongjiao, Longlou, Changsa, Wengtian, Baoluo, Fengpo, Jinshan, Puqian

Wuzhishan City

Towns:
Tongshen, Nansheng, Maoyang, Panyang

Townships:
Changhao Township, Maodao Township, Shuiman Township

Baisha Li Autonomous County

Towns:
Yacha, Qifang, Bangxi, Da'an

Townships:
Xishui Township, Yuanmen Township, Nankai Township, Fulong Township, Qingsong Township, Jinpo Township, Rongbang Township

Baoting Li and Miao Autonomous County

Towns:
Baocheng, Shiling, Jiamao, Xiangshui, Xinzheng, Sandao

Townships:
Liugong Township, Nanlin Township, Maogan Township

Changjiang Li Autonomous County

Towns:
Shilü, Chahe, Shiyuetian, Wulie, Changhua, Haiwei, Qicha

The only township is Wangxia Township

Chengmai County

Towns:
Jinjiang, Laocheng, Ruixi, Yongfa, Jiale, Wenru, Zhongxing, Renxing, Fushan, Qiaotou, Dafeng

Ding'an County

Towns:
Dingcheng, Xinzhu, Longhu, Huangzhu, Leiming, Longmen, Longhe, Lingkou, Hanlin, Fuwen

Ledong Li Autonomous County

Towns:
Baoyou, Wanchong, Da'an, Zhizhong, Qianjia, Jiusuo, Liguo, Huangliu, Foluo, Jianfeng, Yinggehai

Lingao County

Towns:
Lincheng, Bolian, Dongying, Bohou, Huangtong, Duowen, Heshe, Nanbao, Xinying, Tiaolou, Jialai

Lingshui Li Autonomous County

Towns:
Yelin, Guangpo, Sancai, Yingzhou, Longguang, Wenluo, Benhao, Xincun, Li'an

Townships:
Timeng Township, Qunying Township

Qiongzhong Li and Miao Autonomous County

Towns:
Yinggen, Wanling, Limushan, Heping, Changzheng, Hongmao, Zhongping

Townships:
Diaoluoshan Township, Shang'an Township, Shiyun Township

Tunchang County

Towns:
Tuncheng, Xinxing, Fengmu, Wupo, Nanlü, Nankun, Poxin, Xichang

Yangpu Economic Development Zone
The only subdistricts is Xinganchong District

References

 
Hainan
Townships